Bulkowo  is a village in Płock County, Masovian Voivodeship, in east-central Poland. It is the seat of the gmina (administrative district) called Gmina Bulkowo.

References

Bulkowo